In Roman mythology, Lavinia is the daughter of Latinus and Amata, and the last wife of Aeneas.

Creation
It has been proposed that the character was in part intended to represent Servilia Isaurica, Emperor Augustus's first fiancée.

Story
Lavinia, the only child of the king and "ripe for marriage," had been courted by many men who hoped to become the king of Latium. Turnus, ruler of the Rutuli, was the most likely of the suitors, having the favor of Queen Amata. In Vergil's account, King Latinus is warned by his father Faunus in a dream oracle that his daughter is not to marry a Latin:

"Propose no Latin alliance for your daughter

Son of mine; distrust the bridal chamber
Now prepared. Men from abroad will come
And be your sons by marriage. Blood so mingled
Lifts our name starward. Children of that stock
Will see all earth turned Latin at their feet,
Governed by them, as far as on his rounds
The Sun looks down on Ocean, East or West."

Lavinia has what is perhaps her most, or only, memorable moment in Book 7 of the Aeneid, lines 69–83: during a sacrifice at the altars of the gods, Lavinia's hair catches fire, an omen promising glorious days to come for Lavinia and war for all Latins:"While the old king lit fires at the altars

With a pure torch, the girl Lavinia with him, 

It seemed her long hair caught, her head-dress caught 

In crackling flame, her queenly tresses blazed,

Her jeweled crown blazed. Mantled then in smoke

And russet light, she scattered divine fire

Throughout all the house. No one could hold that sight

Anything but hair-raising, marvelous,

And it was read by seers to mean the girl

Would have renown and glorious days to come,

But that she brought a great war on her people."Not long after the dream oracle and the prophetic moment, Aeneas sends emissaries bearing several gifts for King Latinus. King Latinus recognizes Aeneas as the destined one:"I have a daughter, whom the oracles

Of Father's shrine and warning signs from heaven

Keep me from pledging to a native here. 

Sons from abroad will come, the prophets say--

For this is Latium's destiny-- new blood

To immortalize our name. Your king's the man

Called for by fate, so I conclude, and so

I wish, if there is truth in what I presage."Aeneas is said to have named the ancient city of Lavinium for her. 

By some accounts, Aeneas and Lavinia had a son, Silvius, a legendary king of Alba Longa. According to Livy, Ascanius was the son of Aeneas and Lavinia; she led the Latins as a power behind the throne since Ascanius was too young to rule. In Livy's account, Silvius is the son of Ascanius.

In other works 
In Ursula K. Le Guin's 2008 novel Lavinia, Lavinia's character and her relationship with Aeneas is expanded, giving insight into the life of a king's daughter in ancient Italy. Le Guin employs a self-conscious narrative device in having Lavinia as the first-person narrator knowing that she would not have a life without Virgil, who, being the writer of the Aeneid several centuries after her time, is thus her creator.

Lavinia also appears with her father, King Latinus, in Dante's Divine Comedy, Inferno, Canto IV, lines 125–126. She is documented in De Mulieribus Claris, a collection of biographies of historical and mythological women by the Florentine author Giovanni Boccaccio, composed in 136162.

A different Lavinia is a character in William Shakespeare's Titus Andronicus. She is gifted to Saturninus by her father (the titular Titus Andronicus), but she instead elopes with her intended suitor, Bassianus. She is subsequently raped by Tamora's two sons, her tongue and hands cut off so that she can't identify them. In Act 5 she is killed as an honor killing by her father. The rape and mutilation closely mirror the Greek myth of Philomela.

Notes

References 
 Virgil. Aeneid. VII.
 Livy, Ab urbe condita Book 1.

Characters in the Aeneid
Characters in Roman mythology